Eric Lin (born October 14, 1975) is an American surgeon and former tennis player.

Lin grew up in Orange County, California and is of Taiwanese descent.

Ranked as high as eighth nationally in the 18s, Lin featured as a wildcard in the 1993 US Open men's doubles main draw. He and partner Glenn Weiner earned a place in the draw by winning the USTA championships in Kalamazoo.

From 1993 to 1997 he attended UCLA, where he played varsity tennis while studying for a degree in physiological science. He was a three-time All-American and served as the team's co-captain in his senior year.

A graduate of UCLA Medical School, Lin now works as an orthopaedic spine surgeon.

References

External links
 
 

1975 births
Living people
American male tennis players
UCLA Bruins men's tennis players
Tennis players from Los Angeles
Sportspeople from Orange County, California
American sportspeople of Taiwanese descent
David Geffen School of Medicine at UCLA alumni
Fellows of the American Physical Society